Matthys Michielse Basson (born ) is a South African rugby union player for the  in Super Rugby, the  in the Currie Cup and the  in the Rugby Challenge. His regular position is prop.

References

South African rugby union players
Living people
1995 births
People from Oudtshoorn
Rugby union props
Blue Bulls players
Bulls (rugby union) players
Mie Honda Heat players
Rugby union players from the Western Cape